Recintona is a genus of moths belonging to the family Tortricidae.

Species
Recintona cnephasiodes Razowski, 1999

References

 , 1999: Euliini (Lepidoptera: Tortricidae) of Chile. Polskie Pismo Entomologiczne, Bulletin Entomologique Pologne 68: 69-90.

External links
tortricidae.com

Euliini
Tortricidae genera
Taxa named by Józef Razowski